This is a sortable list of all association football matches played by the Republic of Ireland national football team since 1924.

Following the Irish War of Independence from the United Kingdom, the Football Association of Ireland (FAI) was founded in September 1921.  Ireland joined world football governing body FIFA in August 1923 as the Football Association of the Irish Free State (FAIFS).  Ireland's first post-Independence internationals were played at the 1924 Summer Olympics in Paris. The team played as Irish Free State between 1924 and 1935. The name Football Association of Ireland was re-adopted in 1936, and from then until 1954, they played as Ireland; since 1954 they have been Republic of Ireland following the renaming of the team by FIFA, to distinguish them from Northern Ireland.

Ireland competed every four years in the qualification phases of the World Cups and, from 1960, in the qualification phases of the European Nations' Cup, later known as the European Football Championships.

It was not until 1988 that the team succeeded in qualifying for the finals of a major tournament when they went to West Germany to play in the 1988 European Championships. Two years later, Ireland competed for the first time in a World Cup Finals, at Italia '90.

With the exception of Bill Lacey, who was team manager on four occasions during the 1930s, the team was managed and chosen by a committee of selectors of the FAIFS or FAI for more than four decades, until 1969. The team has been managed since then by individuals rather than committees.

List of matches

 Score format:   Irish scores appear first, to the left, irrespective of whether the game was played at home or away.
 Colour codes:

References
 Ireland - International Results Jostein Nygård and Damian Byrne at Rec.Sport.Soccer Statistics Foundation. Retrieved: 2011-09-11.
 Ireland - Record International Players, Appearances for Ireland National Team Roberto Mamrud at Rec.Sport.Soccer Statistics Foundation. Retrieved: 2011-09-11.
 Ireland's International Matches 1926–1981, Football Association of Ireland. Retrieved: 2011-09-11.
 Ireland's International Matches 1982–2011, Football Association of Ireland. Retrieved: 2011-09-11.
 FAI History: The Early Years, Football Association of Ireland. Retrieved: 2011-09-11.
 FAI History: 1930 - 1959, Football Association of Ireland. Retrieved: 2011-09-11.
 FAI History: 1960 - 1986, Football Association of Ireland. Retrieved: 2011-09-11.
 FAI History: McCarthy and Kerr, Football Association of Ireland. Retrieved: 2011-09-11.
 FAI History: The Present Day, Football Association of Ireland. Retrieved: 2011-09-11.
  Republic of Ireland: Fixtures and Results, FIFA. Retrieved: 2011-09-11.
  The History of Soccer in Ireland, Kiltimagh Online. Retrieved: 2011-09-11.
 Ireland Fixtures & Results - 2011 Soccernet. Retrieved: 2011-10-07.
 Republic of Ireland Association of Football Statisticians. Retrieved: 2013-11-04.
 Senior Men's Matches Football Association of Ireland. Retrieved: 2020-12-07

Citations

Republic of Ireland national football team results